The Gold Dust West Carson City (formerly the Pinon Plaza Hotel Casino ) is a hotel and casino located on Hwy 50 in Carson City, Nevada. The Gold Dust West contains  of gaming space, with table games, video poker machines, and slots. The Gold Dust West hotel has 142 rooms. The facility also has a bowling center, snack bar, a heated outdoor swimming pool, and a large hot tub (open in the summer). Like the Gold Dust West Casino in Reno, this facility is owned and operated by Jacobs Entertainment. The Pinon Plaza was owned by Clark Russell, who had owned the Carson Station Hotel Casino in Carson City. Russell operated a shuttle bus system that ran for several years between the Carson Station and the Pinon Plaza.

References

External links
 

1995 establishments in Nevada
Casino hotels
Casinos completed in 1995
Casinos in Carson City, Nevada
Hotels in Carson City, Nevada